Malcolm's Echo: The Legacy of Malcolm X is a 2008 American documentary by Dami Akinnusi about the legacy of Malcolm X.

References

External links
Malcolm's Echo: The Legacy of Malcolm X at the Internet Movie Database

Best Documentary Africa Movie Academy Award winners
American documentary films
2008 films
Films about Malcolm X
2000s American films